Radiodiscus is a genus of small air-breathing land snail, a terrestrial gastropod mollusk in the family Charopidae.

Species
The genus Radiodiscus includes the following species:
 Radiodiscus amoenus (Thiele, 1927
 Radiodiscus bolachaensis Fonseca & Thomé, 1995 - synonym: Endodonta iheringi Thiele, 1927
 Radiodiscus compactus Suter, 1900
 Radiodiscus coppingers Smith, 1881
 Radiodiscus cuprinus Fonseca & Thomé, 2000
 Radiodiscus hollidayi Rutherford, 2020
 Radiodiscus iheringi (Ancey, 1899) - synonym: Stephanoda iheringi Ancey, 1899
 Radiodiscus millecostatus Pilsbry & Ferris, 1906 - type species
 Radiodiscus patagonicus (Suter, 1900)
Rotadiscus pilsbryi Rehder, 1942 
 Radiodiscus promatensis Miquel, Ramírez & Thomé, 2004
 Radiodiscus sanchicoensis Miquel, Ramírez & Thomé, 2007
 Radiodiscus tenellus Hylton Scott, 1957
 Radiodiscus thomei Weyrauch, 1965
 Radiodiscus ubtaoi Salvador, Charles, Simone & Maestrati, 2018
 Radiodiscus vazi Fonseca & Thomé, 1995
 Radiodiscus villarricensis Miquel & Baker, 2009

References 

 
Charopidae
Taxonomy articles created by Polbot